Carleson's theorem is a fundamental result in mathematical analysis establishing the pointwise (Lebesgue) almost everywhere convergence of Fourier series of  functions, proved by .

Statement of the theorem
The result, in the form of its extension by Hunt, can be formally stated as follows:

The analogous result for Fourier integrals can be formally stated as follows:

History
A fundamental question about Fourier series, asked by Fourier himself at the beginning of the 19th century, is whether the Fourier series of a continuous function converges pointwise to the function.

By strengthening the continuity assumption slightly one can easily show that the Fourier series converges everywhere. For example, if a function has bounded variation then its Fourier series converges everywhere to the local average of the function. In particular, if a function is continuously differentiable then its Fourier series converges to it everywhere. This was proven by Dirichlet, who expressed his belief that he would soon be able to extend his result to cover all continuous functions. Another way to obtain convergence everywhere is to change the summation method. For example, Fejér's theorem shows that if one replaces ordinary summation by Cesàro summation then the Fourier series of any continuous function converges uniformly to the function. Further, it is easy to show that the Fourier series of any  function converges to it in  norm.

After Dirichlet's result, several experts, including Dirichlet, Riemann, Weierstrass and Dedekind,  stated their belief  that the Fourier series of any continuous function would converge everywhere. This was disproved by Paul du Bois-Reymond, who showed in 1876 that there is  a continuous function whose Fourier series diverges at one point.

This result had not been improved for several decades, leading some experts to suspect that it was the best possible and that Luzin's conjecture was false. Carleson said in an interview with  that he started by trying to find a continuous counterexample and at one point thought he had a method that would construct one, but realized eventually that his approach could not work. He then tried instead to prove Luzin's conjecture since the failure of his counterexample convinced him that it was probably true.

Carleson's original proof is exceptionally hard to read, and although several authors have simplified the argument there are still no easy proofs of his theorem.
 published a new proof of Hunt's extension which proceeded by bounding a maximal operator. The books  and  also give  proofs of Carleson's theorem.

 showed that for any set of measure 0 there is a continuous periodic function whose Fourier series diverges at all points of the set (and possibly elsewhere). When combined with  Carleson's theorem this shows that there is a continuous function whose Fourier series diverges at all points of a given set of reals if and only if the set has measure 0.

Carleson's  result was improved further by
(Here  is  if  and  otherwise, and if  is a function then  stands for the space of functions  such that  is integrable.)

One can ask if there is in some sense a largest natural space of functions whose Fourier series converge almost everywhere.

The extension of Carleson's theorem to Fourier series and integrals in several variables is made more complicated as there are many different ways in which one can sum the coefficients; for example, one can sum over increasing balls, or increasing rectangles.

The Carleson operator
The Carleson operator  is the non-linear operator defined by

However, proving that it is bounded is difficult, and this was actually what Carleson proved.

See also
Convergence of Fourier series

References

 (Thesis; also: Collected Works, Vol. 1, Moscow, 1953, pp. 48–212)
 "This monograph is a detailed and essentially self-contained treatment of the work of Carleson and Hunt."

Theorems in Fourier analysis